The 2014 County Championship Plate, also known as Bill Beaumont Cup Division 2, was the 13th version of the annual English rugby union, County Championship organized by the RFU for the tier 2 English counties. Each county drew its players from rugby union clubs from the third tier and below of the English rugby union league system (typically National League 1, National League 2 South or National League 2 North). The counties were divided into two regional pools (north/south) with three teams in the north division and three in the south, with the winners of each pool meeting in the final held at Twickenham Stadium.  New teams to the division included Durham County and Kent who were relegated from the 2013 Bill Beaumont Cup. 

By the end of the group stage, both Durham County and Kent,  relegated the previous season, made an instant return to the first division by winning their respective groups with relative ease.  At the final at Twickenham, Kent were comfortable winners, defeating Durham County 31-23 to claim their first title at Twickenham for 28 years.

Competition format
The competition format involved six teams divided into two regional group stages of three teams each, divided into north and south, with each team playing each other once.  The top side in each group went through to the final held at Twickenham Stadium on 1 June 2014.

Participating counties and ground locations

Group stage

Division 2 North

Round 1

Round 2

Round 3

Division 2 South

Round 1

Round 2

Round 3

Final

Total season attendances
Does not include final at Twickenham which was a neutral venue and involved teams from all three county divisions on the same day

Individual statistics
 Note if players are tied on tries or points the player with the lowest number of appearances comes first.  Also note that points scorers includes tries as well as conversions, penalties and drop goals.  Appearance figures also include coming on as substitutes (unused substitutes not included).  Statistics also include final.

Top points scorers

Top try scorers

See also
 English rugby union system
 Rugby union in England

References

External links
 NCA Rugby

2014
2013–14 County Championship